Laurent Mourguet (3 March 1769 – 30 December 1844) was a French puppeteer, creator of the famous puppet Guignol.

See also 
 Guignol

External links 
 Laurent Mourguet on Wikisource
 Société des Amis de Guignol
 Portail des Arts de la Marionnette (PAM)
 Jean Guy Mourguet présente Guignol. Institut national de l’audiovisuel
 Jean-Guy Mourguet raconte Guignol au Musée des marionnettes du monde.

French puppeteers
Entertainers from Lyon
1769 births
1844 deaths